Bandar-e Sofla (also Romanized as Bāndar-e Soflá and Bondar-e Soflá; also known as Bondar-e Pā’īn and Bondar Pā’īn) is a village in Kuhestan Rural District, Kelardasht District, Chalus County, Mazandaran Province, Iran. At the 2006 census, its population was 132, in 42 families.

References 

Populated places in Chalus County